Stour Provost is a village and civil parish in the Blackmore Vale area of north Dorset, England, situated on the River Stour between Sturminster Newton and Gillingham. In old writings it is usually spelled Stower Provost.

Stour Provost once constituted a liberty, containing only the parish itself. Today the civil parish includes the settlements of Woodville and Stour Row to the east. In the 2011 census the civil parish had 235 households and a population of 579.

After the establishment of Stour Provost village near the River Stour, at least four smaller settlements were established in a piecemeal fashion from the 13th century – or perhaps earlier – in the common land or "waste" further east, at Woodville and beyond. These small groups of farms, with their own irregular shaped fields, were separated by unenclosed "waste" probably until the 18th century, when it was enclosed and divided into rectilinear fields.

The nearest railway station is in neighbouring Gillingham, Dorset. Trains run on the Exeter to Waterloo line. 

Stour provost is also home to stour provost cricket club. The club plays at the prov oval. With the main road end and the bell end . Giles Jones is president of the club .

See also
 List of liberties in Dorset

References

External links 

Villages in Dorset
Liberties of Dorset